MŠK Iskra Petržalka is a Slovak football team, based Petržalka, a borough of Bratislava. The club was founded in 1934.

Notable players
The following players had international caps for their respective countries. Players whose name is listed in bold represented their countries while playing for Slovan.
Past (and present) players who are the subjects of Wikipedia articles can be found here.
 Alias Lembakoali

External links 
Official website

References

Iskra Petrzalka
Football clubs in Bratislava
Association football clubs established in 1934
1934 establishments in Slovakia